Tillomorpha is a genus of beetles in the family Cerambycidae, containing the following species:

 Tillomorpha lineoligera Blanchard in Gay, 1851
 Tillomorpha myrmicaria Fairmaire & Germain, 1859

References

Tillomorphini